Nuestra Belleza Estado de México 2011, was held at the Clássico Toluca, Toluca, Estado de México on July 9, 2011. At the conclusion of the final night of competition Nohemí Hermosillo of Toluca was crowned the winner. Hermosillo was crowned by Nuestra Belleza Estado de México 2009 Mercedes Gutiérrez. Eight contestants competed for the title.

Results

Placements

Contestants

References

External links
Official Website

Estado de Mexico, 2011
Nuestra Belleza, 2011
2011 in Mexico